Maurice Leturgie (8 November 1886 – 24 November 1959) was a French racing cyclist. In 1907, he won the inaugural edition of the Scheldeprijs one-day race. He also rode in three editions of the Tour de France.

References

1886 births
1959 deaths
French male cyclists
Sportspeople from Lille
Cyclists from Hauts-de-France